Prototheora corvifera is a species of moth of the family Prototheoridae. It is found in South Africa, where it is known only from the top of Table Mountain. The rocky surface of this sandstone mesa is predominantly covered by a low, bushy vegetation generally referred to as mountain fynbos.

The wingspan is 20–23 mm. Adults have been recorded from the beginning of February to mid-March.

References

Endemic moths of South Africa
Hepialoidea
Moths of Africa
Moths described in 1920